"I Am the Message" was the fifth and final single by British rock band Fightstar, from their second studio album One Day Son, This Will All Be Yours. The song was released as a 7" vinyl and digital download on 16 June.

Music video
The video for "I Am the Message" is a collection of videos taken by the band. These include montages of live performances and spending time in LA where they recorded the album. There are also various clips from older gigs before the second album was recorded.

Track listing
7" vinyl and digital download:
 "I Am The Message" (Album Version)
 "Waiting For Superman" (Flaming Lips cover)

Chart performance

References

Fightstar songs
2008 songs
Songs written by Charlie Simpson
Songs written by Alex Westaway